ACS FC Olt Slatina (formerly known as CS Alro Slatina) was a Romanian professional football club from Slatina, Olt County, Romania, founded in 2006 and dissolved in 2015.

History

The club was founded in the summer of 2006 after the merger of Alprom Slatina and Oltul Slatina.

Until the summer of 2012 it was known as CS Alro Slatina when it was separated from the sports club and renamed FC Olt Slatina (with no connections with the old FC Olt Slatina club that played at Piatra Olt).

The club promoted for the very first time in history to the Liga II at the end of the 2009–10 season when in the last round of the season, it won against the leader of the series until then, FCM Târgovişte.

It finished 5th the 2010–11 and 2011–12 seasons of the Liga II, although at the start of every season the chairman stated that the objective was the promotion to the Liga I.

Before the start of the 2012–13 season of the Liga II the chairman announced once again that the promotion is mandatory. This statement proved to be very far from the truth, in the end, Olt finishing 11th, just above the relegation line.

On 28 August 2015, the club was disbanded and it withdrew from Liga III.

Inter Clinceni, a team from Ilfov County (near Bucharest), was moved to Slatina and continued as Inter Olt Slatina, but it was also disbanded the next year.

Honours
Liga III
Winners (1): 2009–10

Notable former players
The footballers enlisted below have had international cap(s) for their respective countries at junior and/or senior level and/or more than 100 caps for FC Olt Slatina.

Romania
  Nicușor Bancu

References

External links
 Official website 
 FC Olt's page at liga2.ro

Slatina, Romania
Association football clubs established in 2006
Association football clubs disestablished in 2016
Sport in Slatina, Romania
Defunct football clubs in Romania
Football clubs in Olt County
Liga II clubs
Liga III clubs
2006 establishments in Romania
2016 disestablishments in Romania